Lockwood is a town in the City of Greater Bendigo, Victoria. Lockwood was the administrate centre of Marong shire from 1864 to 1908.

References 

Bendigo
Towns in Victoria (Australia)